Terence Martin "Terry" Taylor (born 28 August 1948) is an English guitarist, arranger and songwriter, who started to become known in the latter half of the 1960s as a band member of the group The End, who had a few singles and also a 1969 album release called Introspection. They were produced by Bill Wyman and the album included Charlie Watts playing tabla on the song Shades of Orange. Taylor was one of the members that then played in the follow-up band Tucky Buzzard, who were produced by Bill Wyman.

Career
In 1979, after the ITV strike caused a curtailment in that year's autumn term schedules, Terry Taylor's guitar tunes "The May Dance" and "Les Trois Enfants", were used as interval tracks as an accompaniment for the schools programmes interval slides.

After Tucky Buzzard broke up, after an introduction by Wyman, Taylor joined the band Arrows for their second television series, The Arrows Show. After the death of Alan Merrill in March 2020, Taylor is now the last surviving member of Arrows.

Taylor co-founded the band The Rhythm Kings with Wyman in 1997 and is currently a member.

Personal life
Taylor has one son, Daniel, a result of his relationship with ex-wife Eva Dyrinda Taylor.

References

External links
The Arrows Show information
Terry Taylor with the Rhythm Kings
Terry Taylor with Tucky Buzzard

1948 births
Living people
English rock guitarists
Bill Wyman's Rhythm Kings members